Thomas Hannaford Hurd (bapt. 30 January 1747 – 29 April 1823) was an officer of the Royal Navy, who rose to the rank of captain, becoming the second Hydrographer of the Navy, a Superintendent of Chronometers and a Commissioner on the Board of Longitude. Hurd Peninsula is named after him due to his role in the discovery of Antarctica.

Life 
Hurd joined the navy on 1 September 1768, serving as an able seaman aboard , which was then under the command of Captain Molyneux Shuldham. He served on the Newfoundland and North American stations between 1771 and 1774, part of the time aboard the armed vessel , under Lieutenant Henry Mowat. While with Canceaux Hurd helped Samuel Holland conduct hydrographic surveys. Hurd passed his lieutenant's examination on 1 March 1775, and went on to serve aboard Lord Howe's flagship, . Howe appointed Hurd as lieutenant of HMS Unicorn on 30 January 1777. Unicorn was a frigate under the command of Captain John Ford, which had a coppered hull. Being free of barnacles she was able to capture a great deal of enemy shipping and Hurd as Lieutenant gathered a large amount of prize money. After Unicorns return to England she was one of the small squadron engaged under Captain Sir James Wallace in setting fire to three enemy ships and taking the French ship Danae, a brig and a sloop as prizes in a minor battle on 13 May 1779 off the French coast at Cancale.

Ardent had been recaptured from the French and was one of the prizes. Hurd helped sail her back to England under her commander, Richard Lucas. The battle was a victory for Admiral Sir George Rodney and Great Britain. Following this Hurd suffered on the ill-fated return journey from Jamaica—with Rear-Admiral Thomas Graves—where there were large losses due to a hurricane. Howe recommended Hurd for the post of surveyor-general of Cape Breton, to which he was appointed in 1785, but was dismissed the following year by lieutenant-governor Joseph Frederick Wallet DesBarres.

Hurd was sent to carry out the first exact survey of Bermuda in 1789, a task that took him nine years. On 18 August 1795 he was promoted to the rank of commander, serving as captain of HMS Bermuda and briefly HMS , before returning to HMS Bermuda.

He received promotion to post captain on 29 April 1802. In 1804, he conducted a survey of the harbour of Brest and its surrounding coast. In May 1808, following the death of Alexander Dalrymple, Hurd was the second person to be appointed hydrographer to the admiralty. In the following 15 years, Hurd organised a regular system of surveys and the improved productivity was marked. He is also credited with making sure that his maps, that had been funded by the military, were made available for civilian use by the merchant navy. The Hurd Peninsula is on the south coast of Livingston Island, in the South Shetland Islands. It was named by the UK Antarctic Place-Names Committee in 1961, for Thomas Hurd, RN. Hurd was chosen as it was under his authority that Antarctica was discovered. Hurd's Deep in the English Channel was also named after him.

When Hurd died on 29 April 1823, he was a superintendent of chronometers and a commissioner for the discovery of longitude. Hurd was survived by his wife and he left plantations in both America and the West Indies. To his wife he left "enslaved people on Grenada and Dominica that had been given and bequeathed to him by his 'worthy and respected friend' Samuel Proudfoot of Clapham Common".

References 

1747 births
1823 deaths
English hydrographers
Hydrographers of the Royal Navy
Royal Navy officers
British slave owners